François René de La Tour du Pin, Marquis de la Charce, was a French Military Officer, Politician and Social Reformer.

Life

Early life 
François-René was born on April 1, 1834, in Arrancy, in the Picardy Region of France. He was the eldest son of Humbert de La Tour du Pin, Marquis de La Charce, and Charlotte Alexandrine de Maussion. He came from a long line of French aristocrats, with one his direct ancestors fighting on crusade with Louis IX. François-René was a descendant from an old noble dauphinoise family, which instilled a strong Catholic and Royalist identity in the young René.

François-René's father instilled a spirit of noblesse oblige in the young boy, along with a deep care for his local community and the people that lived in it, especially its poorer members. This spirit of service to local community would later extend to a care for France as a whole.

In 1892, he married his cousin, Marie Séraphine de La Tour du Pin Montauban. The marriage never produced any children.

Military career 
François-René attended École Spéciale Militaire de Saint-Cyr  in 1852. As a Junior Officer, he served the Second Empire in the Crimean War, in Second Italian War of Independence and the French Third Republic during the Franco-Prussian War.Taken prisoner at the surrender of Metz in October 1870, François-René and Albert de Mun, met in a German prisoner of war camp at Aachen (Aix-la-Chapelle).

Publishing and Social Catholicism 
After witnessing the unrest caused by the Paris Commune, La Tour du Pin and Mun were determined to respond to the dilemma of the working class. The following year they organized a Catholic Workers’ club, under the name L’Oeuvre des Cercles Catholiques d’Ouvriers (Society of Catholic Worker Circles), at the request of Maurice Maignen (founder of the Brothers of St. Vincent de Paul). The clubs spread quickly throughout France. These “circles” or clubs brought together the wealthy and the workers from a given locale for prayer, socializing, and hearing lectures by members of the aristocracy. The organization hoped to prevent members of the working class from embracing revolutionary socialism. The clubs were organized based on a national committee and local circles. At the height of the organization's influence in 1881, L'Oeuvre had 550 local circles and reached a maximum membership of 50,000.

The movement provided a theoretical framework for Catholic politics in France, and was influenced by thinkers such as Louis de Bonald, Thomas Aquinas, Frédéric Le Play, and Émile Keller. In 1876, the group founded its own journal, Association Catholique, where members of the organization could present and publisher their work.

From 1877 to 1881, François-René served as military attaché to Austria-Hungary, where he was influenced by Austrian Social Catholicism. While in Frohsdorf, he met exiled Henri, Count of Chambord, the Legitimist pretender to the  French throne. In 1881, he resigned from the army and retired to Arrancy, where he became mayor.

In 1883, Henri's death left the Legitimist line of succession distinctly confused. On one hand, Henri himself had accepted that the head of the Maison de France (as distinguished from the Maison de Bourbon) would be the head of the Orléans line, (the Count of Paris). This was accepted by many Legitimists, and was the default on legal grounds; the only surviving Bourbon line more senior was the Spanish branch, which had renounced its right to inherit the throne of France as a condition of the Treaty of Utrecht. However, many if not most of Henri's supporters, including his widow, chose to disregard his statements and this law, arguing that no one had the right to deny to the senior direct-male-line male Bourbon to be the head of the Maison de France and thus the legitimate King of France; the renunciation of the Spanish branch is under this interpretation illegitimate and therefore void. Thus these Legitimists settled on Juan, Count of Montizón, the Carlist pretender to the Spanish throne (the Salic law having been suspended in Spain, the actual king, Alfonso XII, was not the senior descendant in the male line), as their claimant to the French crown. François-René, along with other supporters of the Count of Chambord, prevented, Philippe d’Orleans (Count of Paris), from claiming the French Crown.

Monarchism and Later Life 
In 1884, De La Tour du Pin traveled to Fribourg, Switzerland for a series of conferences with leading Catholic intellectuals. The proceedings from these meetings would be one of the sources for Pope Leo XIII's encyclical Rerum novarum. In early 1885, while passing through Rome, François-René was received by Pope Leo XIII to discuss Social Catholicism. In 1892, when Leo XIII issued his directive of "Ralliement" (or "rally to the republic", asking French Catholics to work within the French Third Republic), Du Pin stayed true to his monarchist principles and would not accept the legitimacy of the republic.

In 1892, he met a young Charles Maurras and the two began a correspondence with each other that lasted until Du Pin's death.  When Maurras founded Action Française in 1899, François-René assisted the movement and published three articles in the organization's journal of the same name: The Nobility, The Professional Representation, and Territorial Organization of France.  In 1905 he formally joined Action Française, however he left the organization after the First World War due to Maurras's positivism; Maurras only saw the social utility of Catholicism, but did not necessarily believe it to be true. In 1907, Du Pin published Towards a Christian Social Order. François René de La Tour du Pin Chambly, Marquis de la Charce, died in Lausanne, Switzerland, on December 4, 1924, at 90 years of age.

Thought 

Like Frédéric Le Play before him, Du Pin held up the Christian Middle Ages as the great exemplar of social harmony and order between the classes. He called for "a return not to the form, but to the spirit of the institutions of the Middle Ages." He therefore called for a return of the medieval trade guilds and embraced the philosophy of corporatism where employers and employees who belong to the same profession or industry would cooperate via their own unions (or “corporations”). Like G. K. Chesterton, Hilaire Belloc, and the other Distributists, Du Pin believed that property should be as widely distributed as possible, and he encouraged profit sharing programs to gives businesses an incentive to financially assist workers and give them a stake in the well-being of the corporation. However Du Pin did not believe the problems plaguing the European working classes were simply material or financial issues, but also moral and spiritual ones as well; Du Pin felt that only the restoration of the Christian family, increased solidarity between and among the classes, and renewed national unity would fix society. Du Pin rejected both radical socialism and liberalism as products of the Enlightenment, and saw the restoration of intermediate institutions – institutions between the individual and the state – as the only way to ameliorate France's ills. He felt corporatism would simultaneously achieve the decentralization of power and the reduction of social atomization.

Du Pin was likewise a committed Counter-Revolutionary and monarchist until his death, and refused Leo XIII's call to "rally to the republic."

Published works
 Towards a Christian social order - Milestones road 1882–1907, Paris, New National Library, undated (1907), size 8vo, xii + 514 pages.  This is a collection of articles published between 1882 and circumstance 1907 in various journals, mainly the Catholic Revival and French.
This book contains articles into five parts:
 I - Origins of a Program
 II - Social Economy
 III - Social Policy
 IV - Against the Foot of the Revolution
 V - The French Restoration

Writings in English Translation 

 "On the Corporate Regime." In: Blum, Christopher O., editor and translator, Critics of the Enlightenment; pp. 195–215; (2003) ISI Books Wilmington, DE.; Second Ed.(2020) Cluny Media, Providence, RI.

Further reading

'"A program for a Christian social order : the organic democracy of René de La Tour du Pin", (2012), Doctoral Dissertation by Joseph F X Sladky, Catholic University of America (2012) vii, 474 pages.

See also
 Social Catholicism
 Political catholicism
 Christian corporatism
 Christian democracy
 Albert de Mun
 École Polytechnique
 Encyclical Rerum novarum
 Liberal Catholicism
 Jacques Piou
 Marc Sangnier
 Le Sillon

References

 Roger Sémichon, Les idées sociales et politiques de La Tour du Pin exposées d'après son livre "Jalons de route" , éditions Beauchesne 1936.
 Antoine Murat, La Tour du Pin en son temps, Via Romana, 2008

External links 
  René de la Tour du Pin, un analyste supérieur à Karl Marx

Legitimists
1834 births
1924 deaths
French politicians
French military personnel
French social reformers